Judge Brown may refer to:

Ada Brown (judge) (born 1974), judge of the United States District Court for the Northern District of Texas
Addison Brown (1830–1913), judge of the United States District Court for the Southern District of New York
Anna J. Brown (born 1952), judge of the United States District Court for the District of Oregon
Arthur Lewis Brown (1854–1928), judge of the United States District Court for the District of Rhode Island
Bailey Brown (1917–2004), judge of the United States Court of Appeals for the Sixth Circuit
Debra M. Brown (born 1963), judge of the United States District Court for the Northern District of Mississippi
Garrett Brown Jr. (born 1943), judge of the United States District Court for the District of New Jersey
Gary R. Brown (born 1963), judge of the United States District Court for the Eastern District of New York
George Stewart Brown (1871–1941), judge of the United States Customs Court
Henry Billings Brown (1836–1913), judge of the United States District Court for the Eastern District of Michigan, later elevated to the United States Supreme Court
Janice Rogers Brown (born 1949), judge of the United States Court of Appeals for the District of Columbia Circuit
Jeff Brown (judge) (born 1970), judge for the United States District Court for the Southern District of Texas
Joe Brown (judge), (born 1947), American lawyer and television personality
 Judge Joe Brown, American arbitration-based reality court show starring Joe Brown
John Robert Brown (judge) (1909–1993), judge of the United States Court of Appeals for the Fifth Circuit
Michael Lawrence Brown (born 1968), judge of the United States District Court for the Northern District of Georgia
Mick Brown (judge) (1937–2015), judge of the District Court of New Zealand
Morgan Welles Brown (1800–1853), judge of the United States District Courts for the Eastern, Middle, and Western Districts of Tennessee
Nannette Jolivette Brown (born 1963), Chief judge of the United States District Court for the Eastern District of Louisiana
Paul Neeley Brown (1926–2012), judge of the United States District Court for the Eastern District of Texas
R. Lewis Brown (1892–1948), judge of the United States District Court for the District of Montana
Willis Brown (1881–1931), removed Utah juvenile court judge
Wesley E. Brown (1907–2012), judge of the United States District Court for the District of Kansas

See also
Justice Brown (disambiguation)